Balseros (Rafters, from the Spanish Balsa Raft) was the name given to boat people who emigrated without formal documentation in self constructed or precarious vessels from Cuba to neighboring states including The Bahamas, Jamaica, the Cayman Islands and, most commonly, the United States since the 1994 Balsero crisis and during the wet feet, dry feet policy.

History

1994 Cuban rafter crisis

The August 1994 Cuban rafter crisis was the fourth wave of Cuban immigration following Castro's rise to power. The 1994 Balseros Crisis was ended by the agreement of the wet feet, dry feet policy between Bill Clinton and Fidel Castro.

During the 1994 Cuban Rafter Crisis, the most commonly observed raft from the US tanker Coastal New York was constructed of 2 doors atop large truck-tire inner tubes, with the doors connected by 2"x4" wooden beams. A rudimentary 2-3m mast was improvised that supported a small white cloth as a flag or banner that would increase the raft's visibility to vessels traveling nearby. The Coastal New York observed over 75 abandoned rafts in a 4-hour daylight period near the Gulf Stream off Florida's east coast. All the abandoned rafts had been marked with fluorescent orange paint, presumably marked by USCG personnel involved in rescue/recovery operations.

Wet feet, dry feet policy
After 1994 balseros continued to arrive in the United States from Cuba. In the 2015 fiscal year, 4,473 balseros attempted to come to the United States. In fiscal year 2016, the number was 7,411. In January 2017 the Wet feet, dry feet policy came to an end, and now any balsero can be subject to deportation. Shortly before the policy ended the U.S. Coast Guard noticed a spike in balseros attempting to reach the United States.

After 2017
Since the end of the Wet feet, dry feet policy in 2017, fewer balseros attempted to make the journey to the United States. Some still continue to come with less legal support. If they manage to arrive in Florida the only legal way to remain is to apply for political asylum.

Emigration
Often the boats created are unsafe, and utilize engines not often used for boats such as lawnmower engines. Of those that choose to emigrate by raft, some are captured by Cuban authorities, others arrive safely outside Cuba, some are intercepted by United States authorities and given medical care only to be returned to Cuba, while others may be lost at sea and their deaths will go unreported.

Deaths
It is estimated 16,000 to 100,000 Balseros perished at sea in their flight away from Cuba.

See also
 Cuban boat people
 Marielitos 
 Wet feet, dry feet policy 
 Balseros – the title of a 2002 documentary about those persons and their experiences in Cuba and in the United States.

References

External links 
 University of Miami's site: The Cuban Rafter Phenomenon: A Unique Sea Exodus.

Cuban-American history
Cuba–United States relations
Immigration to the United States
Rafting
Cuban refugees